Chilko Lake (Tsylos Park Lodge) Aerodrome  is located near to Chilko Lake, British Columbia, Canada.

References

External links
 Page about this airport on COPA's Places to Fly airport directory
 Tsylos Park Lodge - fly in information

Registered aerodromes in British Columbia
Cariboo Regional District